Survivor is an American reality television show, based on the Swedish program, Expedition Robinson. Contestants are referred to as "castaways" and they compete against one another to become the "Sole Survivor" and win one million U.S. dollars. First airing in 2000, there currently have been a total of 44 seasons aired; the program itself has been filmed on five continents.

Contestants usually apply to be on the show, but the series has been known to recruit contestants for various seasons. For Survivor: Fiji, the producers had hoped to have a more racially diverse cast, and hoped that a more diverse group would apply after the success of the racially segregated Survivor: Cook Islands. When this did not happen, the producers turned to recruiting and in the end, only one contestant had actually submitted an application to be on the show. For the most part, contestants are virtually unknown prior to their Survivor appearance, but occasionally some well-known people are cast.

A total of 662 participants (castaways) have competed so far (as of Survivor 44). 103 of those participants have competed in multiple seasons: 73 of them competed in two seasons, 23 of those have competed in three seasons, six have competed in four seasons, and only Rob Mariano competed in five seasons of the show. Two contestants, Russell Hantz and Sandra Diaz-Twine, have competed on international editions of the series. Thirteen seasons have featured returning players: five with all-returnees (Survivor: All-Stars in 2004, Survivor: Heroes vs. Villains in 2010, Survivor: Cambodia in 2015, Survivor: Game Changers in 2017,  and Survivor: Winners at War in 2020), five with two to four returning players on tribes with new players (Survivor: Guatemala in 2005, Survivor: Redemption Island and Survivor: South Pacific in 2011, Survivor: Philippines in 2012 and Survivor: Edge of Extinction in 2019), two with a tribe of ten returning "Favorites" facing off against a tribe of ten "Fans" (Survivor: Micronesia in 2008 and Survivor: Caramoan in 2013), and one featuring a tribe of ten returning players playing against a tribe of their family members (Survivor: Blood vs. Water in 2013).

On two occasions, contestants have been cast but ultimately withdrew before the game began without being replaced: a 20th contestant, model agency owner Mellisa McNulty, was originally cast in Survivor: Fiji, but dropped out and returned home the night before the show began because of panic attacks, while in Survivor: San Juan del Sur, the 19th and 20th contestants, sisters So and Doo Kim, were removed just before filming due to a medical emergency. Fiji and San Juan del Sur proceeded with an uneven gender balance. This occurrence made the show's fourteenth season, Fiji, the only season in the history of the show to start with an odd number of players.

Key legend
Table key:

Seasons 1–5 (2000–2002)

All information is accurate as of the time the season was filmed, and thus may vary from season to season for returning players.

Seasons 6–10 (2003–2005)

All information is accurate as of the time the season was filmed, and thus may vary from season to season for returning players.

Seasons 11–15 (2005–2007)
 

All information is accurate as of the time the season was filmed, and thus may vary from season to season for returning players.

Seasons 16–20 (2008–2010)

All information is accurate as of the time the season was filmed, and thus may vary from season to season for returning players.

Seasons 21–25 (2010–2012)
 

All information is accurate as of the time the season was filmed, and thus may vary from season to season for returning players.

Seasons 26–30 (2013–2015)

All information is accurate as of the time the season was filmed, and thus may vary from season to season for returning players.

Seasons 31–35 (2015–2017)

All information is accurate as of the time the season was filmed, and thus may vary from season to season for returning players.

Seasons 36–40 (2018–2020)

All information is accurate as of the time the season was filmed, and thus may vary from season to season for returning players.

Seasons 41–present (2021–present)
All information is accurate as of the time the season was filmed, and thus may vary from season to season for returning players.

References

General

Specific

Survivor (American TV series) contestants